Bulat-Yelga (Bulatyılğa) is a rural locality (a village) in Novoartaulsky Selsoviet, Yanaulsky District, Bashkortostan, Russia. The population was 74 as of 2010. There are 2 streets.

Geography 
Bulat-Yelga is located 21 km northwest of Yanaul (the district's administrative centre) by road. Novy Artaul is the nearest rural locality.

References 

Rural localities in Yanaulsky District